Charles Finch (born 1980) is an American author and literary critic. He has written a series of mystery novels set in Victorian era England, as well as literary fiction and numerous essays and book reviews.

Life and career
Finch was born in New York City the son of the art critic Charlie Finch.  He graduated from Phillips Academy and Yale University, where he majored in English and History.  He also holds a master's degree in Renaissance English Literature from Merton College, Oxford. He is the grandson of American artist and writer Anne Truitt.

His first published novel, A Beautiful Blue Death, introduced gentleman sleuth Charles Lenox. The book was named one of Library Journal’s Best Books of 2007 and was nominated for the Agatha Award for best new mystery of 2007.  The Fleet Street Murders came out in 2009 and was nominated for the Nero Award. The Woman in the Water, released in 2018, is a prequel presenting the beginning of Lenox’s career in detection. The series is published by St. Martin's Minotaur, a division of St. Martin's Press.

Finch's first contemporary novel, The Last Enchantments, was published by St. Martin's Press in early 2014.

He has written for The New York Times and Slate and regularly writes essays and criticism for The New York Times, The New York Times Book Review, The New Yorker, the Guardian, the Chicago Tribune and USA Today.  He was a 2014 finalist for the National Book Critics Circle's Nona Balakian Citation for Excellence in Reviewing, losing to Alexandra Schwartz of The New Yorker. He won the award in 2017.

Finch serves on the curatorial board of the arts colony Ragdale and the board of the National Book Critics Circle.

Bibliography

Charles Lenox series 
A Beautiful Blue Death, 2007 Hardcover 
2007 Large print 
2008 Paperback 

2009 German translation (Bella Indigo) 
2010 Russian translation (Прекрасная голубая смерть) 
2011 Audio 
The September Society, 2008 Hardcover 
2009 Paperback 
2010 Large print 
2010 German translation (September Society der Club der tödlichen Gentlemen) 
2011 Audio 
The Fleet Street Murders, 2009 Hardcover 
2009 Large print 
2010 Paperback 
2011 Audio 
A Stranger in Mayfair, 2010 Hardcover 
2011 Audio 
2011 Large print 
2011 Paperback 
A Burial at Sea, 2011 Hardcover 
2011 Audio 
2012 Paperback 
2012 Large print 
A Death in the Small Hours, 2012 Hardcover 
2012 Audio 
2013 Large print 
2013 Paperback 
An Old Betrayal, 2013 Hardcover 
2013 Audio 
2014 Large print 
2014 Paperback 
The Laws of Murder, 2014 Hardcover 
2014 Audio 
2015 Large print 
2015 Paperback 
Home by Nightfall, 2015 Hardcover 
2016 Audio 
2016 Large print 
2016 Paperback 
The Inheritance, 2016 Hardcover 
2016 Audio 
2017 Large print 
2017 Paperback 
The Woman in the Water (prequel), 2018 Hardcover  
2018 Audio 
2019 Paperback 
The Vanishing Man (prequel), 2019 Hardcover 
2019 Audio 
2021 Paperback 
The Last Passenger (prequel), 2020 Hardcover 
2020 Audio 
2021 Paperback 
An Extravagant Death, 2021 Hardcover 
2021 Audio

Other work
The Last Enchantments, 2014 Hardcover 
Paperback 
Large print 
Audio 

What Just Happened?, 2021

References

External links
St. Martin's Author Profile
Questions & Answers with Charles Finch

1980 births
American mystery novelists
21st-century American novelists
Living people
Writers from New York City
Phillips Academy alumni
Yale University alumni
Alumni of Merton College, Oxford
American expatriates in England
American male novelists
21st-century American male writers
Novelists from New York (state)